Mohamed Amine Darmoul (born 4 February 1998) is a Tunisian handball player for GWD Minden and the Tunisian national team.

He represented Tunisia at the 2021 World Men's Handball Championship.

References

1998 births
Living people
Tunisian male handball players
Mediterranean Games competitors for Tunisia
Competitors at the 2022 Mediterranean Games
20th-century Tunisian people
21st-century Tunisian people